is a manga series written and illustrated by Kazumi Yamashita which has been serialized in Kodansha's Weekly Morning since 1988. It won the Kodansha Manga Award for general manga in 2003.

External links
Official website

Manga creation in anime and manga
Kodansha manga
Seinen manga